Zaw Win may refer to:
 Zaw Win (footballer)
 Zaw Win (politician)